The 2003–04 Louisville Cardinals men's basketball team represented the University of Louisville in the 2003–04 NCAA Division I men's basketball season. The head coach was Rick Pitino and the team finished the season with an overall record of 20–10.

References 

Louisville Cardinals men's basketball seasons
Louisville
Louisville Cardinals men's basketball, 2003-04
Louisville Cardinals men's basketball, 2003-04
Louisville